Sulcus of spinal cord may refer to:

 Anterolateral sulcus of spinal cord
 Posterolateral sulcus of spinal cord
 Posterior median sulcus of spinal cord